Double-precision floating-point format (sometimes called FP64 or float64) is a floating-point number format, usually occupying 64 bits in computer memory; it represents a wide dynamic range of numeric values by using a floating radix point.

Floating point is used to represent fractional values, or when a wider range is needed than is provided by fixed point (of the same bit width), even if at the cost of precision. Double precision may be chosen when the range or precision of single precision would be insufficient.

In the IEEE 754-2008 standard, the 64-bit base-2 format is officially referred to as binary64; it was called double in IEEE 754-1985. IEEE 754 specifies additional floating-point formats, including 32-bit base-2 single precision and, more recently, base-10 representations.

One of the first programming languages to provide single- and double-precision floating-point data types was Fortran. Before the widespread adoption of IEEE 754-1985, the representation and properties of floating-point data types depended on the computer manufacturer and computer model, and upon decisions made by programming-language implementers. E.g., GW-BASIC's double-precision data type was the 64-bit MBF floating-point format.

IEEE 754 double-precision binary floating-point format: binary64
Double-precision binary floating-point is a commonly used format on PCs, due to its wider range over single-precision floating point, in spite of its performance and bandwidth cost. It is commonly known simply as double. The IEEE 754 standard specifies a binary64 as having:
 Sign bit: 1 bit
 Exponent: 11 bits
 Significand precision: 53 bits (52 explicitly stored)
The sign bit determines the sign of the number (including when this number is zero, which is signed).

The exponent field is an 11-bit unsigned integer from 0 to 2047, in biased form: an exponent value of 1023 represents the actual zero. Exponents range from −1022 to +1023 because exponents of −1023 (all 0s) and +1024 (all 1s) are reserved for special numbers.

The 53-bit significand precision gives from 15 to 17 significant decimal digits precision (2−53 ≈ 1.11 × 10−16). If a decimal string with at most 15 significant digits is converted to the IEEE 754 double-precision format, giving a normal number, and then converted back to a decimal string with the same number of digits, the final result should match the original string. If an IEEE 754 double-precision number is converted to a decimal string with at least 17 significant digits, and then converted back to double-precision representation, the final result must match the original number.

The format is written with the significand having an implicit integer bit of value 1 (except for special data, see the exponent encoding below).  With the 52 bits of the fraction (F) significand appearing in the memory format, the total precision is therefore 53 bits (approximately 16 decimal digits, 53 log10(2) ≈ 15.955).  The bits are laid out as follows:

The real value assumed by a given 64-bit double-precision datum with a given biased exponent  
and a 52-bit fraction is
 
or
 

Between 252=4,503,599,627,370,496 and 253=9,007,199,254,740,992 the representable numbers are exactly the integers. For the next range, from 253 to 254, everything is multiplied by 2, so the representable numbers are the even ones, etc. Conversely, for the previous range from 251 to 252, the spacing is 0.5, etc.

The spacing as a fraction of the numbers in the range from 2n to 2n+1 is 2n−52.
The maximum relative rounding error when rounding a number to the nearest representable one (the machine epsilon) is therefore 2−53.

The 11 bit width of the exponent allows the representation of numbers between 10−308 and 10308, with full 15–17 decimal digits precision. By compromising precision, the subnormal representation allows even smaller values up to about 5 × 10−324.

Exponent encoding
The double-precision binary floating-point exponent is encoded using an offset-binary representation, with the zero offset being 1023; also known as exponent bias in the IEEE 754 standard. Examples of such representations would be:

The exponents 00016 and 7ff16 have a special meaning:
 000000000002=00016 is used to represent a signed zero (if F = 0) and subnormal numbers (if F ≠ 0); and
 111111111112=7ff16 is used to represent ∞ (if F = 0) and NaNs (if F ≠ 0),
where F is the fractional part of the significand. All bit patterns are valid encoding.

Except for the above exceptions, the entire double-precision number is described by:

 

In the case of subnormal numbers (e = 0) the double-precision number is described by:

Endianness

Double-precision examples

Encodings of qNaN and sNaN are not completely specified in IEEE 754 and depend on the processor. Most processors, such as the x86 family and the ARM family processors, use the most significant bit of the significand field to indicate a quiet NaN; this is what is recommended by IEEE 754. The PA-RISC processors use the bit to indicate a signaling NaN.

By default, 1/3 rounds down, instead of up like single precision, because of the odd number of bits in the significand.

In more detail:
 Given the hexadecimal representation 3FD5 5555 5555 555516,
   Sign = 0
   Exponent = 3FD16 = 1021
   Exponent Bias = 1023 (constant value; see above)
   Fraction = 5 5555 5555 555516
   Value = 2(Exponent − Exponent Bias) × 1.Fraction – Note that Fraction must not be converted to decimal here
         = 2−2 × (15 5555 5555 555516 × 2−52)
         = 2−54 × 15 5555 5555 555516
         = 0.333333333333333314829616256247390992939472198486328125
         ≈ 1/3

Execution speed with double-precision arithmetic
Using double-precision floating-point variables is usually slower than working with their single precision counterparts. One area of computing where this is a particular issue is parallel code running on GPUs. For example, when using NVIDIA's CUDA platform, calculations with double precision take, depending on a hardware, approximately 2 to 32 times as long to complete compared to those done using single precision.

Additionally, many mathematical functions (e.g., sin, cos, atan2, log, exp and sqrt) need more computations to give accurate double-precision results, and are therefore slower.

Precision limitations on integer values 
 Integers from −253 to 253 (−9,007,199,254,740,992 to 9,007,199,254,740,992) can be exactly represented
 Integers between 253 and 254 = 18,014,398,509,481,984 round to a multiple of 2 (even number)
 Integers between 254 and 255 = 36,028,797,018,963,968 round to a multiple of 4

Implementations
Doubles are implemented in many programming languages in different ways such as the following. On processors with only dynamic precision, such as x86 without SSE2 (or when SSE2 is not used, for compatibility purpose) and with extended precision used by default, software may have difficulties to fulfill some requirements.

C and C++
C and C++ offer a wide variety of arithmetic types. Double precision is not required by the standards (except by the optional annex F of C99, covering IEEE 754 arithmetic), but on most systems, the double type corresponds to double precision. However, on 32-bit x86 with extended precision by default, some compilers may not conform to the C standard or the arithmetic may suffer from double rounding.

Fortran
Fortran provides several integer and real types, and the 64-bit type real64, accessible via Fortran's intrinsic module iso_fortran_env, corresponds to double precision.

Common Lisp
Common Lisp provides the types SHORT-FLOAT, SINGLE-FLOAT, DOUBLE-FLOAT and LONG-FLOAT.  Most implementations provide SINGLE-FLOATs and DOUBLE-FLOATs with the other types appropriate synonyms. Common Lisp provides exceptions for catching floating-point underflows and overflows, and the inexact floating-point exception, as per IEEE 754.  No infinities and NaNs are described in the ANSI standard, however, several implementations do provide these as extensions.

Java

On Java before version 1.2, every implementation had to be IEEE 754 compliant. Version 1.2 allowed implementations to bring extra precision in intermediate computations for platforms like x87. Thus a modifier strictfp was introduced to enforce strict IEEE 754 computations. Strict floating point has been restored in Java 17.

JavaScript
As specified by the ECMAScript standard, all arithmetic in JavaScript shall be done using double-precision floating-point arithmetic.

JSON
The JSON data encoding format supports numeric values, and the grammar to which numeric expressions must conform has no limits on the precision or range of the numbers so encoded. However, RFC 8259 advises that, since IEEE 754 binary64 numbers are widely implemented, good interoperability can be achieved by implementations processing JSON if they expect no more precision or range than binary64 offers.

See also
 IEEE 754, IEEE standard for floating-point arithmetic
 D notation (scientific notation)

Notes and references

Binary arithmetic
Computer arithmetic
Floating point types